Kathy Tomlinson is a Canadian reporter and investigative journalist.

Tomlinson worked as a reporter for CITV-DT. During her time as a reporter with the Canadian Broadcasting Corporation, she won the 2013 Canadian Association of Journalists award for Labour reporting for the story about RBC foreign workers. In 2015 she joined the staff of The Globe and Mail.

References

External links
 
 

Canadian television reporters and correspondents
Canadian women television journalists
CBC Television people
Living people
Year of birth missing (living people)
The Globe and Mail people
20th-century Canadian journalists
21st-century Canadian journalists
20th-century Canadian women